Diego Ignacio Paz (born 10 August 1992) is an Argentine field hockey player who plays as a midfielder for French Club Lille and the Argentine national team.

He represented Argentina at the 2020 Summer Olympics.

Club career
During the 2019–20 season he played for Klein Zwitserland in the Dutch Hoofdklasse. After the 2020 Summer Olympics he joined French club Lille.

References

External links
Tokyo 2020 profile 

1992 births
Living people
Argentine male field hockey players
Field hockey players at the 2020 Summer Olympics
Male field hockey midfielders
Olympic field hockey players of Argentina
HC Klein Zwitserland players
Men's Hoofdklasse Hockey players
Place of birth missing (living people)
21st-century Argentine people